Hitler's War may refer to:

 Hitler's War, biography of Adolf Hitler by David Irving
 Hitler's War, military history book by Edwin Palmer Hoyt
 Hitler's War (novel), war novel, part of The War That Came Early series by Harry Turtledove
 Hitler's War (game), strategy war game by Metagaming Concepts
 World War II

See also 
 Hitler's Peace: A Novel of the Second World War by Philip Kerr